Alquerubim is a civil parish in the municipality of Albergaria-a-Velha, Portugal. The population in 2011 was 2,381.

References

Freguesias of Albergaria-a-Velha